Hutnik Kraków – was a handball section of the same name club from Poland based in Nowa Huta, Kraków's district. The team played at the highest level of the Polish Handball League. Three–time Polish Champion (1979, 1980, 1981) and three–time Polish Cup winner (1978, 1983, 1986).

Honours
 Polish Superliga
Winners (3): 1978–79, 1979–80, 1980–81

 Polish Cup
Winners (3): 1977–78, 1982–83, 1985–86

References

See also
 Handball in Poland
 Sports in Poland

Polish handball clubs
Sport in Kraków
Handball clubs established in 1961
1961 establishments in Poland